Peter Munro Aitchison (born 19 September 1931) is an English former footballer who played as a winger in the Football League for Colchester United. His younger brother Barrie also played professionally for Colchester.

Career

Born in Harlow, Aitchison signed for Colchester United in August 1950 and signed a professional contract a year later, making his professional debut whilst still on National Service. In the game against Gillingham on Christmas Day in 1951, Aitchison scored 17 minutes into his debut as the U's went on to record a 2–1 victory.

Ironically, Aitchison's final professional goal came the following day in the reverse fixture against Gillingham as Colchester recorded a 1–0 victory at Layer Road. Alongside his two goals, Aitchison turned out for Colchester 18 times, recording nine appearances during the 1951–52 season and three appearances in 1952–53. He failed to make an appearance during 1953–54 but returned making six appearances in 1954–55 before leaving for Sittingbourne. He would go on to represent Haverhill Rovers, Clacton Town, Stowmarket Town, Tiptree United and Brightlingsea United.

Later life

Aitchison remained in the Colchester area following his retirement from the game, where he worked for BT until his retirement in September 1991.

References

1931 births
Living people
Sportspeople from Harlow
English footballers
Association football wingers
Colchester United F.C. players
Sittingbourne F.C. players
Haverhill Rovers F.C. players
F.C. Clacton players
Stowmarket Town F.C. players
Tiptree United F.C. players
Brightlingsea Regent F.C. players
English Football League players
British Telecom people
People from the Borough of Colchester
Military personnel from Essex
20th-century British military personnel